Lungotevere Testaccio is the stretch of lungotevere that connects piazza dell'Emporio with Largo Giovanni Battista Marzi (that is, between the ponte Sublicio and the ponte Testaccio), in Rome, in the Rione of the same name.

History

The Lungotevere is named after the Monte Testaccio, a relief formed in ancient times by the accumulation of debris and shards (testae in Latin) from the nearby Emporium; it was established by resolution of 20 July 1887.

Below the current retaining wall there are the remains of the walls of the Emporium, which were, in the nineteenth century, excavated and paved and stripped of the marbles that had remained for centuries to under the mud of the Tiber.

To remember the excavations carried out by Pietro Ercole Visconti in this area, which allowed among other things to recover (and reuse) many ancient marbles, was erected by Pope Pius IX in 1869 a fountain made of a Roman sarcophagus used as a bath  on which stands the memorial inscription:

With the construction of the last section of walls on the Tiber, in the 1920s, the fountain was reassembled by inserting it in the wall towards the river.

Notes

Sources 

Testaccio
Streets in Rome R. XX Testaccio